Noss is the name given to an Iron Age hill fort situated close to Dartmouth in Devon, England. The fort is situated on the South Western slope of a promontory on the Eastern side of a hill west of the Village of Hillhead some 65-80 Metres above Sea Level overlooking Noss Point in the Dart Estuary.

References

Hill forts in Devon
Dartmouth, Devon